Deportivo SIMA is a Peruvian football club, playing in the city of Callao, Peru.

History 

The club was the 1969 and 1971 Peruvian Segunda División champion.

The club have played at the highest level of Peruvian football in the 1970, 1972, and 1973 Torneo Descentralizado when was relegated.

Honours

National
Peruvian Segunda División:
Winners (2): 1969, 1971

Regional
Liga Departamental del Callao:
Winners (1): 2006
Runner-up (1): 2003

Liga Provincial del Callao:
Winners (1): 1967

Liga Distrital del Callao:
Winners (6): 1974, 1976, 1982, 1999, 2006, 2009
Runner-up (6): 1985, 1987, 2000, 2001, 2008, 2010

See also 

 Copa Perú
 List of football clubs in Peru
 Peruvian football league system

External links 

 Official Website

Association football clubs established in 1950
Football clubs in Peru